Nebraska Highway 7 is a highway in Nebraska.  Its southern terminus is at Nebraska Highway 91 in Brewster.  Its northern terminus is at U.S. Highway 183 near Springview.

Route description

Nebraska Highway 7 goes north out of Brewster and heads north through the Sand Hills until it meets U.S. Highway 20 in Ainsworth.  It goes east with US 20 into farmland from Ainsworth, and meets U.S. Highway 183 between Ainsworth and Long Pine.  The three highways overlap until Bassett, where NE 7 turns north.  NE 7 follows a route which goes alternately north and west past the Niobrara River and ends at US 183 south of Springview.

The segment of highway it shares with US 183 and US 20 is a wrong-way concurrency, as while US 20 is going east, NE 7 is going north and US 183 is going south.  Also, the segment of NE 7 between Bassett and Springview is a former segment of US 183.  Previously Highway 7 went north from Ainsworth, crossing the Niobrara River at Meadville then continuing north to Highway 12.  Signage in Ainsworth calls the road both "Old Highway 7" and "Meadville Road".  One old concrete highway marker is still in place fourteen miles north of Ainsworth.

Major intersections

References

External links

The Nebraska Highways Page: Highways 1 to 30
Nebraska Roads: NE 1-10

007
Transportation in Blaine County, Nebraska
Transportation in Brown County, Nebraska
Transportation in Rock County, Nebraska
Transportation in Keya Paha County, Nebraska